Cobban may refer to:
Cobban, Wisconsin, unincorporated community, United States

People with the surname:
Alfred Cobban (1901–1968), British Professor of French History
Helena Cobban (born 1952), British writer and researcher on international relations
James Cobban (politician) (1870–1934)
James Cobban (1910–1999), British educator